Saksi formerly known as Saksi: GMA Headline Balita and Saksi: Liga ng Katotohanan is a Philippine television news broadcasting show broadcast by GMA Network. Originally anchored by Mike Enriquez and Karen Davila, it premiered on October 2, 1995 on the network's evening line up replacing GMA Balita. Arnold Clavio and Pia Arcangel currently serve as  the anchors.

History

Saksi: GMA Headline Balita

The early years (1995–1996)
On October 2, 1995, GMA Network launched the newscast, originally entitled Saksi: GMA Headline Balita, as a 15-minute early evening weekday newscast. It was then anchored by Mike Enriquez (then known as "Mr. Saksi") and Karen Davila. Saksi became popular in such a short time, that people were using the word as a catchphrase, complete with the pointed forefinger like the program’s news anchors. In the early years of the newscast, the anchors especially Enriquez, popularized the word "pasok" (come in) in introducing reporters (who included Jessica Soho, Arnold Clavio, Mao dela Cruz and Susan Enriquez, among others). The format is patterned after AM radio newscasts wherein its fast paced and compressed to a short program.

Mike Enriquez, Karen Davila and Mel Tiangco (1996–1998)
On July 8, 1996, Mel Tiangco joined Enriquez and Davila, after her transfer from ABS-CBN when she was suspended from doing a TV commercial. Economist Solita "Winnie" Monsod also joined the newscast with her own opinion segment, "Mareng Winnie" (which became a moniker by which she has been since known for). Other special segments, such as Huling Hirit (light human-interest stories to cap the newscast, reported by Kara David), S na S (Showbiz sa Saksi) (a showbiz segment with Lyn Ching then she anchored with Enriquez, Davila and Tiangco) and Jessica Soho Reports were also added to the news program, as its set was reformatted and running time was expanded to 30 minutes.

Jay Sonza, Mel Tiangco and Luchi Cruz-Valdes (1998–1999)
In 1998, the show was relaunched when Partners Mel and Jay and Tapatan with Jay Sonza host Jay Sonza and Luchi Cruz-Valdes joined Mel Tiangco and they replaced Enriquez and Davila while Enriquez appointed as an anchor of GMA Network News with Vicky Morales who and the news team switched the newscast to Taglish then Filipino. Sonza, who was also transferred from ABS-CBN as news anchors with Mel Tiangco, continued to use Mike Enriquez's catchphrase "pasok" when he anchored the newscast. Davila, on the other hand became a co-host of Extra-Extra, a magazine program featuring different human-interest and entertainment stories (which also served as pre-programming to Saksi). New segments such as, "Pulso ng Mamamayan" where the program asks to citizens to speak up and tell them what they think of what's happening in the country today. Thus, Saksi and Partners Mel and Jay are the news programs exclusive to them and expanded the newscast to 45 minutes.

Saksi (1999–2004)

Mike Enriquez and Vicky Morales (1999–2004)
On August 23, 1999, Tiangco was appointed as anchor of Frontpage: Ulat ni Mel Tiangco, which replaced GMA Network News on the late-night weeknight slot. She, Sonza and Valdes were replaced by Enriquez and Morales, thus continuing their partnership on Network News. The original subtitle, GMA Headline Balita, was also dropped since then. Enriquez returned to Saksi after a year of absence. He continued to used the word "pasok" but only for live reports. In the last quarter of 1999, this style of introducing reporters was also previously used in GMA's other regional news programs patterned after "Saksi" premiered on October 4 like Balitang Bisdak (GMA Cebu), Testigo (GMA Davao, now One Mindanao) and Ratsada (GMA Iloilo, now relaunched into One Western Visayas). The studio set also used chroma-key technology, and later on they transferred to the newly built GMA Network Center in 2000. This was also the beginning of simulcasting the newscast on the network's radio station, Super Radyo DZBB 594 kHz.

On July 15, 2002, Saksi exchanged timeslots with Frontpage in order for the latter show to compete with ABS-CBN's TV Patrol (which was, incidentally, the newscast that Tiangco came from before transferring to GMA). By the same day, the program is reformatted as a late night newscast. The shift to late-night also prompted the start of "Side Trip", a human-interest segment hosted by Howie Severino.

In the same year, Saksi won the Gold Medal for Best Newscast in the New York Festival, becoming one of the few news programs outside the United States to receive the said honor. The award (With the Peabody Award that the network won in 1998) was later recognized by the Philippine Congress by issuing the network a commendation for its work in News and Public Affairs.

On June 30, 2003, along with Unang Hirit, Frontpage: Ulat ni Mel Tiangco, and GMA Flash Report, it relaunched and introduced its new studio set, new theme music, and graphic package.

On March 12, 2004, Enriquez left the newscast to join Frontpage anchor Mel Tiangco as anchors of 24 Oras.

Saksi: Liga ng Katotohanan

Arnold Clavio and Vicky Morales (2004–2014)
After Enriquez's transfer to the network's new early evening newscast 24 Oras, Unang Hirit host Arnold Clavio was named anchor of the newscast joining Morales. It was relaunched as Saksi: Liga ng Katotohanan (League of Truth) on March 15, 2004.

The newscast changed its graphics and studio with its title card thrice during this period; first on April 17, 2006 (which was the time where 24 Oras shared the studio set til present), second on August 11, 2008, and third on November 2010 (graphics only).

Saksi (2011–present)
On February 21, 2011, together with Unang Hirit and 24 Oras, the program adapted a new set, new graphics, new theme, and new OBB. The "Liga ng Katotohanan" tagline was also dropped in the newscast's titlecard and launched a new slogan "Ikaw at ang Balita" (You and the News). With the help of social media, Saksi launched a segment called "Saksi Ako" where viewers can make their own report there by using cellphone and camera recordings via GMA's Youscoop. The new theme is incorporated with the elements of the 2008–2011 theme music & 2004–2008 theme music and its 2004-2008 bed music. Months after the reformat, Saksi re-designed its graphic packages, and in July 2013, it launched its segment "Midnight Snack", a food-trip segment hosted by Mikael Daez every Mondays to Thursdays, After a one-week hiatus, On November 5, 2013, it returned under the new title "Midnight Express".

Arnold Clavio and Pia Arcangel (2014–present)
In 2014, as part of GMA News' shakeup, Pia Arcangel was appointed co-anchor replacing Vicky Morales who moved to 24 Oras. The new Saksi launched in November 10, 2014 with new upbeat soundtracks, its newly flat graphic package, and its new title card starts to continue using the camera lens backdrop.

On December 17, 2018, the newscast began airing on Studio 2, as its main studio, Studio 5 (which was also used by 24 Oras and State of the Nation with Jessica Soho) underwent renovations. Studio 2 is also the studio where GMA News TV's programs are filmed.

On May 13, 2019, in time with the 2019 Philippine general election, the newscast returned to the newly-renovated Studio 5 along with 24 Oras and State of the Nation with Jessica Soho. The newscast aired with new OBB, graphics, upbeat soundtracks, and logo.

In April 2020, the program was suspended due to the enhanced community quarantine in Luzon caused by the COVID-19 pandemic. The show resumed its programming on June 1, 2020.

Anchors

 Arnold Clavio 
 Pia Arcangel 
 Mikael Daez 

Former anchors
 Mike Enriquez 
 Karen Davila 
 Mel Tiangco 
 Winnie Monsod 
 Lyn Ching 
 Kara David 
 Jessica Soho 
 Amado Pineda 
 Rey Pacheco 
 Jay Sonza 
 Luchi Cruz-Valdes 
 Vicky Morales 
 Howie Severino 
 Bernadette Sembrano 

Interim anchors
 Luchi Cruz-Valdes 
 Sandra Aguinaldo 
 Lala Roque 
 Rhea Santos 
 Mariz Umali 
 Tina Panganiban-Perez 
 Kara David 
 Ivan Mayrina 
 Jun Veneracion 
 Raffy Tima 
 Susan Enriquez 
 Chino Gaston 
 Emil Sumangil 
 Joseph Morong 
 Oscar Oida 
 Maki Pulido 
 Mark Salazar

Segments
 Barangay Saksi
 Bonus Shot
 Midnight Express
 News Bullets 
 Sakcess
 Showbiz Saksi
 Sports Saksi

Defunct
 Huling Hirit
 Jessica Soho Reports
 Mareng Winnie
 Midnight Snack
 S na S: Showbiz na Saksi
 Side Trip

Accolades

References

External links
 
 

1995 Philippine television series debuts
1990s Philippine television series
Filipino-language television shows
Flagship evening news shows
GMA Network news shows
GMA Integrated News and Public Affairs shows
Philippine television news shows
Television productions suspended due to the COVID-19 pandemic
Sign language television shows